Miahuatlán may refer to:

Places

Mexico
 Miahuatlán, Amacuzac
 Miahuatlán, Cunduacán
 Miahuatlán, Metztitlán
 Miahuatlán, Omealca

Oaxaca
Miahuatlán District
Miahuatlán de Porfirio Díaz
Sierra de Miahuatlán, south-easternmost range in the Sierra Madre del Sur
Santa Lucía Miahuatlán

Puebla
Santiago Miahuatlán
San José Miahuatlán

Veracruz
Miahuatlán (Veracruz)

Others
Miahuatlán cotton rat (Sigmodon planifrons), a rodent species in the family Cricetidae
Miahuatlán Zapotec, Zapotec language spoken in southern Oaxaca, Mexico.